Maykov, or Maykova (feminine; Ма́йкова) is a Russian last name and may refer to:

Apollon Alexandrovich Maykov (1761–1838) Russian poet and State Counsellor, father of Nikolay
Nikolay Maykov (1794–1873) Russian painter and his sons:
Apollon Maykov (1821–1897)  Russian poet
Valerian Maykov (1823–1847) Russian writer and literary critic
Vladimir Maykov (1826-1885) Russian publisher
Leonid Maykov (1839–1900) Russian literary expert, ethnographer and academician
Vasili Maykov (1728–1778) Russian poet and playwright, uncle of Apollon Alexandrovich